Donald Havioyak is a territorial-level politician in Canada. He served as a member of the Nunavut Legislature.

Havioyak was elected to the Nunavut legislature in the 1999 Nunavut general election. He won the Kugluktuk electoral district with a plurality of six votes defeating three other candidates. Havioyak served one term in office, running for re-election in the 2004 Nunavut general election. He was defeated by candidate Joe Allen Evyagotailak in another very close election.

After his defeat in the election, he became President of the Kitilkmeot Inuit Association. He is a notable Copper Inuit.

Havioyak is a first cousin with former Northwest Territories MLA Kane Tologanak.

References

Members of the Legislative Assembly of Nunavut
21st-century Canadian politicians
Living people
Inuit politicians
People from Kugluktuk
Inuit from the Northwest Territories
1950 births
Inuit from Nunavut